Muhammad Rahim is an Afghan who is held in captivity by the United States Government at Guantanamo Bay. He was born in eastern Afghanistan. Muhammad Rahim worked for an Afghan government committee that worked to eliminate opium poppies from the nation. He was forced to leave his job by the Taliban. In 1979, Rahim fled Afghanistan with his brother over the border of Pakistan. Their departure was triggered by the Soviet Union invasion into Afghanistan.

In 2007 The Nation reported that Muhammad Rahim and Sheikh Ilyas Khel had been apprehended by Pakistani security officials.
The Nation described him as "Osama bin Laden's special aide", and asserted he had negotiated with Hazrat Ali in early 2002.

While in Pakistan, Muhammad Rahim was captured and turned over to the U.S. Central Intelligence Agency (CIA) for interrogations regarding Rahim's interactions with the Taliban. In CIA custody, Rahim was subjected to long periods of sleep deprivation and other methods of torture as part of the Rendition, Detention and Interrogation (RDI) Program.  He was the last known person to be admitted subject to the CIA's RDI program.

After several months of CIA interrogations and torture, however, Rahim, in March 2008, was sent to Guantanamo Bay, Cuba where he is held in extrajudicial detention. Described as a "tough, seasoned jihadist" by the head of the CIA, Rahim was accused of helping Osama bin Laden escape capture as well as working as bin Laden's translator and assistant.  Rahim is the last prisoner to have been sent to Guantanamo. Despite his five years in Guantanamo, no charges have been made against Muhammad Rahim. The US military has stated that it has no intention of trying him in a military commission.  The United States government, through the Periodic Review Secretariat, has also announced that it does not intend to recommend his release.  Accordingly, he is a "forever prisoner." He is also not a possible candidate for an exchange peace deal.
The United States Department of Defense announced he had been transferred to military custody on 14 March 2008.

According to Agence France-Presse:

The New York Times reported that he was the first captive to be transferred from CIA custody in close to a year.

He was captured in Lahore, Pakistan, in June 2007, and tortured by the CIA as part of the Rendition Detention and Interrogation Program until his transfer to Guantanamo on or about March 28, 2008.
According to the official press release announcing his transfer to Guantanamo he had been held in the CIA's network of secret interrogation centers prior to his transfer to Guantanamo.  The Pentagon classified him as a high value detainee, an appellation he shared with the 14 captives transferred from the CIA on September 6, 2006, and with Abdul Hadi al Iraqi.
That press release stated:

While in Guantanamo Bay, Muhammad Rahim is being detained in Camp 7, a place for men who are deemed "'high value' detainees by the US Government." While in American custody in Guantanamo, Rahim has yet to have charges filed against him or have a court appearance to defend himself and present his case.

In late November 2008 the New York Times published a page220px summarizing the official documents from each captive.
The New York Times stated that no further official records of his detention—no Combatant Status Review Tribunal had been published.
They identified him as identified captive 10030.
They identified him as a "high value detainee".

In 2002 the BBC reported that an individual named "Mohammed Rahim" was one of the Taliban senior leader Mohammed Omar's drivers.
According to the BBC, in an interview with Reuters in January 2002, Mohammed Rahim described how the Taliban's senior leader escaped two American missile strikes.

In his interview Mohammed Rahim said that when Mohammed Omar's home in Kandahar was hit by a missile strike he engaged him to drive his taxi, containing Mohammed Omar, his second wife, and several of his children to Sangisar, an hour away.
Almost immediately after their arrival, and exit from his taxi, it too was struck by a missile.  The missile struck the taxi, nothing else in the village was targeted. Mohammed Rahim said he fled one way, and Mohammed Omar fled another, and that this was his last contact with him.

Muhammad Rahim's lawyer, Carlos Warner of Akron, Ohio, describes how even when meeting with his client, Rahim is still shackled. Warner has filed a civil writ of habeas corpus seeking Rahim's release because of the lack of charges against his client after five years of detention.

During his time in Guantanamo, Rahim has written several letters to Carlos Warner, which Warner has recently made public. Rahim's letters expose his incredible awareness of American pop culture, including a criticism of LeBron James. His lawyer explains that his unrest with LeBron James' move from the Cleveland Cavaliers to the Miami Heat was rooted in Rahim's feelings of intense loyalty. Muhammad Rahim also wrote that he "like[s] this new song Gangnam Style" and "[wants] to do the dance for [Carlos Warner] but cannot because of [his] shackles." In addition to knowledge of American pop culture through reading magazines Carlos Warner brings to Guantanamo during visits, Rahim's letters expose his aptitude for language.

Rahim wrote his lawyer to "Tell the guards to leave [his] friend alone. They need to chillax." These letters do not portray the exposed distress and disheartenment expected of a Guantanamo Bay detainee. Carlos Warner believes that Rahim's letters show that "he's different and he's intelligent... just think that he's doing this under all the restrictions that he's under down there. He has an incredibly good sense of humor."

Reports of "extended interrogation techniques"

In August 2009 formerly classified documents about the CIA's use of torture were made public when the judicial branch upheld Freedom of Information Act requests.
On August 27, 2009, Pamela Hess and Devlin Barrett, of the Associated Press, reported that in late 2007 the CIA subjected a captive was chained to the floors and walls of his cell, and subjected to extended sleep deprivation.
They noted while the captive's name was withheld Al-Afghani was the only captive known to have been in CIA custody at the time of the use of these techniques. They noted that the Bush Presidency had publicly abandoned the use of these techniques, but an exception was made because government lawyers had given the CIA permission.

The captive had his hands chained above the level of his heart.
He was made to wear diapers, so he would not have to be unbound for bathroom breaks.  When observers watching over closed-circuit TV saw him start to fall asleep they were able to wake him by remotely jerking his shackles.  When he developed edema, swelling of the legs, a common consequence of the use of these techniques he was shifted to being bound to a low stool, still with his hands bound above the level of his heart.

References

External links

 UN Secret Detention Report (Part One): The CIA’s “High-Value Detainee” Program and Secret Prisons Andy Worthington

Detainees of the Guantanamo Bay detention camp
Afghan extrajudicial prisoners of the United States
Taliban members
Living people
1965 births